David Lee (born 6 September 1958) is an Australian sound engineer. He won an Oscar for Best Sound for the 1999 film The Matrix and was nominated for the same award for the 2014 film Unbroken. He has worked on over 35 films since 1981.

Selected filmography
 The Matrix (1999)
 Unbroken (2014)

Academy Awards

References

External links

1958 births
Living people
Australian audio engineers
Place of birth missing (living people)
Best Sound Mixing Academy Award winners
Best Sound BAFTA Award winners